Tewai Skipwith-Halatau (born 11 April 1956) is a New Zealand Paralympian who competed in athletics. At the 1980 Summer Paralympics, she won a bronze medal in the Women's Discus A event.

References

External links 
 
 

1956 births
Living people
Paralympic athletes of New Zealand
Athletes (track and field) at the 1980 Summer Paralympics
Medalists at the 1980 Summer Paralympics
Paralympic bronze medalists for New Zealand
New Zealand female discus throwers
Paralympic discus throwers